Saeng Chan Beach is one of the well-known beaches in Rayong, Thailand. It is located approximately 6 kilometers from Rayong City. It is on the east coast of the Gulf of Thailand. It is one of four connected beaches that stretch for 11 kilometers along the bay, the others being Laem Charoen Beach, Suchada Beach, and Sai Thong Beach. There are few beach amenities and the other side of the beach road where the seafood restaurants are located, is mostly undeveloped. Furthermore, this location was once a fishermen's village. Previously, when this beach was not widely known, villagers had thrown trash at this beach. However, this beach is now being cleaned by the government, villagers, tourists, and volunteers.

History 
Saeng Chan Beach is one of many beaches along the Leab Chai Fang Road together with Suchada Beach and Maerumpung Beach which are adjacent to each other. In the past, this area was the location of a fishing village that grew from Paknam Rayong.The name of Saeng Chan Beach, "Saeng Chan" means “moonlight”. It is from the appearance of each pool of the coast that it looks like the moon crest concaves into the coast. In addition, Saeng Chan Beach also has another common name called "PMY Beach" which most people in the area called by the name of the hotel in the area that has been around for a long time.

One feature that distinguishes this beach from others is the presence of numerous man-made stone barriers running the length of the beach in the water. However, the stone barriers have not always existed in the first place. The reason for the barrier's construction was due to long-ago sea reclamation and the development of a port in the Map Ta Phut Industrial Estate, which had the effect of shifting the wind and water direction, making coastline erosion more severe than previously. As a result, the rocky barriers were designed to prevent those issues. Then, as a result of the presence of barriers, crescent moon-shaped pools appeared and continue to exist to this day.

Furthermore, when viewed from above, the appearance of rocky barriers on each coast can be seen, which are aligned in a T-shape along the beach alternating with crescent moon-shaped pools.

Transportation 
Saeng Chan Beach can be reached by car, and there are two ways to get to the beach when starting from Bangkok.

 Sukhumvit Road: Running on the Sukhumvit Road before reaching Mueng Rayong, then turn right as long as the Saeng Chan Beach sign. The end of the road is a three-way intersection of the Sea Butterfly statue and Phra Apai mani statue. Then turn right to the our goal, Saeng Chan Beach.
 Highway 36 : From Highway 36, pass the intersection at Map Ta Phut Industrial Estate. Then turn right at the next intersection, cut into the Sukhumvit Road. After reach the Sukhumvit Road, turn left to Rayong-Jantaburi. Then continue driving to Leab Chai Fang Road, and then turn right to reach the goal, Saeng Chan Beach.

Geography and climate

Geography 
Saeng Chan Beach has a man-made rock embankment like the barrier along the coast to prevent coastal erosion. Therefore, the pools were occurred along the coast and formed in the shape of a crescent moon along the way of Saeng Chan Beach.

Climate 

 The sea temperature : The average sea temperature is 29℃. The coolest water is in January (27℃). The hottest water is in May (30℃).
 The average temperature : The temperature ranges from 21 °C to 33 °C, with temperatures rarely falling below 18 °C or rising above 35 °C.

Neighborhoods 
The list of places near Saeng Chan Beach

 Phra Chedi Klang Nam

              It is one of the well-known chedis in Rayong. It is to the east of Saeng Chan Beach. It is located approximately 5 kilometers from the beach. Tourists can visit Phra Chedi Klang Nam from 6 a.m. to 5 p.m. It opens daily.

 Samed Island

              It is the most populated island in Rayong. It is under the protection of the National Parks Division of the Thai government. It is to the southeast of Saeng Chan Beach. It is located approximately 30 kilometers from the beach.

 Rayong Province Stadium

              It is a stadium in Rayong province which is currently used for football matches. It is to the north of Saeng Chan Beach. It is located approximately 3 kilometers from the beach. It opens daily from 8.30 a.m. to 4.30 p.m.

 Rayong Museum

              The Rayong Old City Conservation Club established this museum with the goal of preserving the city's history and to be a compilation of Rayong's nice old artifacts such as old pictures or numerous equipment that depict the Rayong people's lives in the past. It is to the northeast of Saeng Chan beach. It is located approximately 6 kilometers from the beach. It opens daily except Saturday and Sunday from 8 a.m. to 8 p.m.

 Ko Kloi Market

              The Ko Kloi Market sells food, traditional coffee, and souvenirs in a retro ambience with performances for visitors to enjoy. It is in the northeast of the Saeng Chan beach. It is located approximately 7 kilometers from the beach. It opens daily from 10 a.m. to 9 p.m.

 Pa Pradu Temple

              It is a royal monastery. This historic temple was established during the reign of Ayutthaya. It is to the northeast of the Saeng Chan Beach. It is located approximately 6 kilometers from the beach. It opens daily from 8 a.m. to 5 p.m.

 Lum Mahachai Chumphon Temple

              It is a royal monastery and it is an old temple since the Ayutthaya period. According to history, it was established in the year 1691. This temple is revered by the Rayong people. It is to the northeast of the Saeng Chan beach. It is located approximately 7 kilometers from the beach. It opens daily from 9 a.m. to 5 p.m.

Gallery 
Gallery of Saeng Chan Beach and neighborhoods.

References 

Geography of Rayong province
Beaches of Thailand